Robert C. Banks, Jr. (born September 7, 1966) is an American experimental filmmaker.

Biography
Banks attended the Cleveland School of the Arts and has taught film at Cuyahoga Community College, the Cleveland Institute of Art, and Cleveland State University.

His best known work is the 1992 film, X: The Baby Cinema, a 4.5 minute, 16 mm short film which chronicled the commercial appropriation of the image of Malcolm X. The movie appeared on the compilation video The Best Of The New York Underground:Year One.

The 1994 feature documentary film, You Can't Get a Piece of Mind explores the world of Cleveland musician and Vietnam veteran, Dan "Supie T" Theman.

Banks has had his films shown at the Sundance Film Festival, was named Filmmaker of the Year at the Midwest Filmmakers Conference, and in 2000, he was the honored guest filmmaker in London at the BBC British Short Film Festival.

Banks lives in Cleveland, Ohio.

Filmography

 (1989) Untitled (16 mm)
 (1990) Froggy Central (16 mm)
 (1992) Eyes (16 mm)
 (1993) X The Baby Cinema (16 mm)
 (1994) My First Drug....The Idiot Box (16 mm)
 (1996) You Can't Get a Piece of Mind (16 mm)
 (1997) MPG: Motion Picture Genocide (35 mm)
 (1998) Jaded (35 mm)
 (1999) Outlet (35 mm)
 (1999) Embryonic (35 mm)
 (1999) Gold Fish Sunflowers (35 mm)
 (1999) Bone Face (35 mm)
 (1999) Love Rusty (8 mm/16 mm/35 mm)
 (2000) Rage Against the Dying Light 
 (2002) Autopilot 
 (2003) The Devil's Filmmaker: Bohica (cinematographer only)
 (2004) A.W.O.L. (35 mm)
 (2004) Banks vs. Barney (parody of Matthew Barney's Cremaster)
 (2006) Cordoba Nights (A.K.A. 'A Corboba in Bronston') Directed by Luke and Andy Campbell-(16 mm) (co-director of photography only)
 (2019) Paper Shadows (16 mm)
 (2022) Color Me Bone Face

Awards
 Filmmaker of the Year (2001), Midwest Filmmakers Conference
 Jury Citation Award for Outlet, Black Mariah Film Festival
 Prize Pieces Award, National Black Programming Consortium
 Best Experimental for X-The Baby Cinema (1993), The First NY Underground Film Festival
 Won Audience Choice Award for Paper Shadows (2019), at the Chicago Underground Film Festival 2020

See also
Experimental film
Structuralist film theory

References

External links

 Bio: Moovlab
 Festival: 13th Annual BBC British Short Film Festival
 Festival: 2001 retrospective at Chicago Underground Film Festival

1966 births
American cinematographers
American experimental filmmakers
American film directors
Cleveland State University alumni
Living people